Ennuyire is an Indian Tamil-language soap opera that aired Monday through Thursday on MediaCorp Vasantham from 7 December 2015 to 30 March 2016 at 10:00PM SST for 62 episodes.

The show starred Aravind Naidu, Nithiya Rao, Jobu Deen Faruk and Bharathi Rani Arunachalam among others. It was produced and director by Roja Tamilmaran and Kumaran Sundram.

Plot
The story of Ennuiyre follows the lives of Gautham and Sathiya, the adopted sons of Aadhi, an illegal moneylender. Gautham falls in love with Harini and the incidents that results after that, forever alters the relationship between both brothers. Will Gautham be able to safeguard his love in the face of danger? This is a tale of how love can push a man beyond his limitations when faced with adversities.

Cast

Main cast

Shamini Gunasagar
 Aravind Naidu as Gautham 
 Nithiya Rao 
 Jobu Deen Faruk as Sathiya
 Bharathi Rani Arunachalam

Additional cast

 Balakumaran
 Vikneswary Se
 Kokila
Subramaniyam
Duraishiva as Guest Appearance
 Elias Mikhail
 Vaishnavi Chelvan
 Alikhan
 Vinathi Naidu
 Santhy 
 Jegan
 Shafie Regum

Original soundtrack

Soundtrack

References

External links 
 Vasantham Official Website
 Vasantham Facebook
 Ennuyire Serial Episode

Tamil-language romance television series
Tamil-language thriller television series
Singapore Tamil dramas
2015 Tamil-language television series debuts
Vasantham TV original programming
Tamil-language television shows in Singapore
2016 Tamil-language television series endings
2010s Tamil-language television series